The 2022 Wakefield Metropolitan District Council election took place on 5 May 2022 to elect members of Wakefield Council. This was on the same day as other local elections. 21 of the 63 seats were up for election.

Background
Since its first election in 1973, Labour has always controlled Wakefield Council, only falling below 60% of seats on 4 occasions (most recently in 2010). In the 2021 election, Labour lost 6 seats with 45.1% of the vote, the Conservatives gained 6 seats with 37.5%, the Liberal Democrats gained 1 with 3.0%, and independents lost 1 with 2.1%

The seats up for election this year were last elected in 2018. In that election, Labour lost 1 seat with 51.7% of the vote, the Conservatives gained 4 with 34.0%, independents lost 1 with 3.9%, and UKIP lost both their seats up for election with 1.1%.

Previous council composition 

Changes:
 December 2021: Ian Womersley (independent) joins Labour
 March 2022: Akef Akbar leaves Conservatives to sit as an independent
 Paul Stockhill leaves Conservatives to sit as an independent
 Conservative group leader Nic Stansby leaves Conservatives to sit as an independent.

Results 
Change with 2021.

Results by ward
An asterisk indicates an incumbent councillor. Changes with 2021.

Ackworth, North Elmsall and Upton

Airedale and Ferry Fryston

Altofts and Whitwood

Castleford Central and Glasshoughton
Denise Jeffery is the incumbent Leader of the Council going into the election.

Crofton, Ryhill and Walton

Featherstone
Dick Taylor sat as a Labour councillor, however, stood as an independent following his de-selection by the local party.

Hemsworth

Horbury and South Ossett

Knottingley

Normanton
Isabel Owen was the Deputy Police and Crime Commissioner for West Yorkshire under Mark Burns-Williamson.

Ossett

Pontefract North

Pontefract South

South Elmsall and South Kirkby

Stanley and Outwood East
Lynn Masterman is a former Labour councillor for Ossett ward before losing in the 2021 election.

Wakefield East

Wakefield North

Wakefield Rural

Wakefield South

Wakefield West

Wrenthorpe and Outwood West
Nic Stansby was the Leader of the Conservative group before being de-selected by her local branch. Waj Ali is a former Brexit Party member and candidate.

See also
 2022 Wakefield by-election

References

Wakefield
Wakefield Council elections